Mike Heisler is an American comic book writer known for his work on the series DV8 and Union. He also penned the Gen¹³ mini-series Gen¹³: Interactive and the one-shot Gen¹³: The Unreal World.

Heisler got his start in the industry in the late 1980s as a letterer, primarily for Marvel Comics. From there, he moved into writing and editing.

In December 2009, Heisler was announced as the editor of a revived version of the landmark monster movie magazine Famous Monsters of Filmland.

Heisler has also worked for Dark Horse Comics.

Notes

References 
 

Year of birth missing (living people)
Living people
American comics writers